Krkonoše National Park (often abbreviated as KRNAP) is a national park in the Liberec and Hradec Králové regions of the Czech Republic. It lies in the Krkonoše Mountains which is the highest range of the country. The park has also been listed as a UNESCO Biosphere Reserve site. It borders Karkonosze National Park in Poland.
Krkonoše's highest mountain is Snow Mountain (Sněžka - 1602 m) which is also the highest mountain in the Czech republic.

The National Park management headquarters are located in the town of Vrchlabí, often called the Gateway to Krkonoše.

Resources 

 Opera Corcontica - Scientific Journal from the Krkonoše National Park

External links 

 Official website of the park
 Forests of Krkonoše National Park (youtube video)

National parks of the Czech Republic
Biosphere reserves of the Czech Republic
Ramsar sites in the Czech Republic
Protected areas established in 1963
Geography of the Liberec Region
Geography of the Hradec Králové Region
Tourist attractions in the Liberec Region
Tourist attractions in the Hradec Králové Region
1963 establishments in Czechoslovakia